Corentin Cherhal (born 19 January 1994, in Rennes) is a French cyclist who rides for Team Novo Nordisk.

References

1994 births
Living people
French male cyclists
Cyclists from Rennes